Backyard Soccer, known in Europe as Backyard Football (PC) or Junior Sports Football (PlayStation) and in Australia as Junior Sports Soccer, is an association football video game in the Backyard Sports series, developed by Humongous Entertainment and published by Infogrames. It was first released in September 1998 for Macintosh and Microsoft Windows, in 2001 for the PlayStation, and in 2008 for iOS. The PC and PlayStation versions of the game, alongside the PlayStation 2 version of Backyard Basketball, were the only Backyard Sports titles released in Europe.

Gameplay
The player selects a team, aiming to win promotion from the "B" Division, to the "A" and then Premier Division. If in the top four by mid-season in any division, the player's team will be invited to the Off-The-Wall Indoor Invitational. After winning the Premier Division, the player's team will be invited to represent the United States in the Astonishingly Shiny Cup of All Cups Tournament (a spoof of the FIFA World Cup). Regardless of the tournament's outcome, the player's team will be placed back in the Premier Division for another chance at the Cup.

There are several power-ups that a team can use. To activate a power-up, the player has to click on the opponent's goal:
 Cannon - the player launches a fast and powerful shot.
 Underground - the ball goes underground and pops up in a random place.
 Bowling Ball - the ball transforms into a giant bowling ball knocking over any opposing players.
 Tracer - the ball is controlled using the cursor and the players click where they want the ball to go.

Reception
Backyard Soccer received moderate reviews. Its gameplay was criticized for the hard-to-use controls for the PC version and long loading time, while its graphics were praised on all platforms. Brad Cook of Allgame was critical to the controls for PC version.

References

External links
 

1998 video games
Humongous Entertainment games
Infogrames games
Association football video games
IOS games
Classic Mac OS games
Windows games
PlayStation (console) games
Multiplayer and single-player video games
Video games developed in the United States